Doug Worgul (born September 13, 1953) is an American writer and editor based in Kansas City.

Early life and education
Raised mostly in Lansing, Michigan, Worgul is the oldest of three siblings.  He graduated from J.W. Sexton High School in 1971, and attended Gordon College (Massachusetts) from 1971 to 1972. He graduated from Western Michigan University in 1976 with a BA in political science, and again in 1977 with a M.A. in education, with an emphasis on the teaching of reading. While a student at Western Michigan University, he studied writing and poetry under Stuart Dybek. Worgul lived in Kalamazoo County, Michigan, from 1973 to 1989.

Career
Worgul moved to Kansas City in 1989 and worked for The Kansas City Star newspaper as a writer, book and features editor, and editor of Star Magazine from 1996 to 2006.  He was previously editor of Kansas City Magazine.  Prior to his work as a journalist, Worgul was a social worker and an advertising and marketing consultant. 

A nationally recognized authority on the history and cultural significance of American barbecue traditions, Worgul has been interviewed and/or cited in numerous national and regional newspapers and magazines on the subject, and has also appeared on two History Channel programs. From 2010 to 2020, he was Director of Marketing at Joe's Kansas City Bar-B-Que. Worgul is the author of The Grand Barbecue: A Celebration of the History, Places, Personalities and Techniques of Kansas City Barbecue (Kansas City Star Books, 2001).

In 2003, while at The Kansas City Star, Worgul discovered a Toynbee Tile at the corner of 13th and Grand in downtown Kansas City. He wrote about the Kansas City Toynbee Tile and the worldwide Toynbee Tiles mystery in an award-winning article published on The Star's website. The article has been cited frequently in subsequent articles about the Toynbee Tile phenomenon.

Worgul's first novel, Thin Blue Smoke, set in a fictional barbecue joint in Kansas City, is a story of love, loss, despair, redemption, squandered gifts, second chances, whiskey, God, and the secret language of rabbits. It was published in the UK by Macmillan Publishers in 2009. The U.S. edition of Thin Blue Smoke was published by Burnside Books, now Bower House, in September 2012. A strong sense of place permeates Worgul's writing. His writing has been compared to that of John Irving, Richard Russo, Kent Haruf, David James Duncan, and Frederick Buechner. Thin Blue Smoke was a 2010 finalist for The People's Book Prize (UK). The Englewood Review of Books named Thin Blue Smoke its Novel of the Year in 2012. And the publishing blog, GalleyCat, named the book as one of 2012's 'Most Overlooked' books.

Matthew Quick, author of the critically acclaimed novel Silver Linings Playbook, praised Thin Blue Smoke, saying "As Norman Maclean's A River Runs Through It does for Montana fly-fishing, Doug Worgul's Thin Blue Smoke makes the poetry of Kansas City barbecue accessible to all readers. More than gorgeous prose and fully developed characters – this novel offers us catharsis. Communion has never tasted so good."

Rajiv Joseph, the Pulitzer Prize-nominated playwright also praised Worgul's Thin Blue Smoke, saying "Emerging from this book, I want to go back, I want to live with these characters for just a little longer, I want their voices in my head. Thin Blue Smoke is a wandering through a community bound by their shared histories, their dreams, and the food they love. It reminds me of the best things in life. Like the good food holding these stories together, you can't believe your luck when you sit down before a full plate. And Doug Worgul has done what all great writers strive to do: make you crave for more."

A review posted on Amazon (Aprill 2020) said of Thin Blue Smoke “…the prose will draw you in like a John Prine song.”

In 2009, the (UK) website Mr B's Emporium of Reading Delights said Thin Blue Smoke was “As gentle & positive as a novel can be in the 21st century without being naff”.

Thin Blue Smoke has been included on annual assigned reading lists at The Barstow School. The book has also been taught at the University of Missouri Honors College and the Rutgers University Honors College. 

The film and television rights to Thin Blue Smoke have been optioned.

On October 22, 2012, Worgul delivered a lecture at The Buechner Institute at King College in Bristol, Tennessee, as part of the annual Buechner Lecture Series. In July 2013, Worgul was named to the National Advisory Board of the Buechner Institute. Other members of the Advisory Board included theologian Walter Brueggemann, novelist Ron Hansen, essayist and memoirist Kathleen Norris, author Phyllis Tickle, and author Philip Yancey. In May 2014, Worgul was a featured speaker at Buechner Fest in Charlotte, North Carolina, an event devoted to the exploration and celebration of the works of Frederick Buechner.

In January 2019, Worgul was named the first Visiting Author in Residence at University of Missouri Honors College.

Personal life
Worgul is the grandson of Francena H. Arnold, author of Not My Will and nine other works of fiction. He has four daughters and eight grandchildren and lives in Leawood, Kansas with his wife.

Books

Novels 
 Thin Blue Smoke (Macmillan, 2009) (Burnside Books, 2012) (Conundrum Press, 2015)

Non-Fiction 
 A Table Full of Welcome (Kansas City Star Books, 2002)
 The Grand Barbecue: A Celebration of the History, Places, Personalities and Techniques of Kansas City Barbecue (Kansas City Star Books, 2001)
 Kansas City Quiltmakers: Portraits & Patterns (Kansas City Star Books, 2001)

References
"Meet Kansas City", Southwest Airlines Spirit Magazine, 2008, 
Author bio, www.panmacmillan.com,

External links 

 "Space Oddity", Kansas City Star, September 6, 2003
 Thin Blue Smoke on Amazon
 Publisher's official site
 
 12 Books of Fiction That Will Shape Your Theology
Looking for a Book to Read During the Holiday Break

1953 births
Living people
J. W. Sexton High School alumni
Western Michigan University alumni
The Kansas City Star people
Writers from Kalamazoo, Michigan
People from Battle Creek, Michigan
People from Lansing, Michigan
Writers from Michigan
Writers from Kansas City, Missouri